Bredbury and Woodley is an electoral ward in the Metropolitan Borough of Stockport. It elects three Councillors to Stockport Metropolitan Borough Council using the first past the post electoral method, electing one Councillor every year without election on the fourth.

The ward is located in the east of Stockport, and is bordered by Bredbury Green & Romiley, and Brinnington & Central wards. Together with  Bredbury Green and Romiley, Hazel Grove, Marple North, Marple South and Offerton it constitutes the Hazel Grove Parliamentary constituency. The ward has two train stations both Bredbury Station and Woodley, offering regular services to Manchester.

Councillors
Bredbury and Woodley electoral ward is represented in Westminster by William Wragg MP for Hazel Grove.

The ward is represented on Stockport Council by three councillors: Vince Shaw (Lib Dem), Stuart Corris (Lib Dem), and Sue Thorpe (Lib Dem).

 indicates seat up for re-election.

Elections in the 2010s

May 2019

May 2018

May 2016

May 2015

May 2014

May 2012

May 2011

References

External links
Stockport Metropolitan Borough Council

Wards of the Metropolitan Borough of Stockport